Now That's What I Call Music! 49, released on February 4, 2014, is the 49th edition of the Now! series in the United States. The album features three Billboard Hot 100 number-one hits: "Timber", "Royals", and "Wrecking Ball".

Now! 49 debuted at number one on the Billboard 200 albums chart with sales of 98,000 copies in its first week of release. As of June 2014, 482,000 copies of the compilation had been sold.

Track listing

Charts

Weekly charts

Year-end charts

References

External links

2014 compilation albums
 049
Universal Music Enterprises compilation albums